Ushatan Talukder is a Bangladeshi politician and was the member of parliament for Rangamati Hill District from 2014 to 2018. He is a leader of the indigenous community of Rangamati.

Career
Ushatan Talukder was elected to Parliament from Rangamati Hill District in 2014 as an independent candidate. On 10 June 2018, Bangladesh Police arrested 7 people for attempting to extort Ushatan. He is the General Secretary of the Parbatya Chattagram Jana Samhati Samiti.

References

Living people
10th Jatiya Sangsad members
People from Rangamati District
1950 births
University of Chittagong alumni